Freedom House is a think tank based in Washington, D.C., United States.

Freedom House may also refer to:
Freedom House (Roxbury, Massachusetts), community organization
Freedom House Ambulance Service, the first emergency medical technician service in America, founded in 1967
Freedom House Museum, also known as the Franklin and Armfield Office, anti-slavery museum in Alexandria, Virginia, United States
Inter-Korean House of Freedom, an administration building on the South Korea side of the Joint Security Area between North and South Korea

See also
Liberty House (disambiguation)